On November 17, 1992, during the 1992–93 offseason, Major League Baseball (MLB) held an expansion draft in New York City to allow two  expansion teams, the Florida Marlins and Colorado Rockies, to build their rosters prior to debuting in the National League's (NL) East and West divisions, respectively, in the 1993 MLB season.

The 1990 collective bargaining agreement between MLB owners and the MLB Players Association allowed the NL to expand by two members to match the American League (AL). In June 1991, MLB accepted bids of groups from Miami, Florida, and Denver, Colorado, with debuts set for 1993.

The Marlins and Rockies used the expansion draft to build their teams using different strategies. As the Rockies had a smaller operating budget than the Marlins, the Rockies targeted prospects with low salaries, while the Marlins selected older players intended to provide more immediate impact. All three rounds of the draft were televised by ESPN.

Background

Major League Baseball (MLB) team owners and the MLB Players Association agreed to expand the National League (NL) by two teams in the 1990 collective bargaining agreement. Prior to expansion, the NL had 12 teams while the American League had 14.

In June 1991, MLB accepted two bids for expansion franchises: one for Miami, Florida, and the other for Denver, Colorado. Both teams were set to debut in 1993. Expansion was approved unanimously by all teams in July 1991. The Denver group chose to call their franchise the Colorado Rockies, the same name used as the National Hockey League franchise that played in Denver from 1976 to 1982. The Miami group chose to call themselves the Florida Marlins to broaden their fanbase to the entire state, while reviving the nickname of the Miami Marlins, a defunct Minor League Baseball team. An expansion draft to stock both franchises was set for November 1992.

Procedure
In contrast to previous expansion drafts, players from both the American League (AL) and National League (NL) were available to the expansion clubs. Each existing club could protect 15 players on their 40-man roster from being drafted and only one player could be drafted from each team in each round. At the end of each round, NL teams could protect an additional three players and AL teams could protect an additional four. To further protect the AL teams, a maximum of eight AL teams could have three players chosen.

All unprotected MLB and minor league players were eligible except those chosen in the amateur drafts of 1991 or 1992 and players who were 18 or younger when signed in 1990. Players who were free agents after the 1992 season were not eligible for selection in the draft. The Rockies and Marlins, however, were not restricted in offering contracts to free agents. The Rockies signed their first free agent, Andrés Galarraga, to a one-year contract the day before the expansion draft.

The draft order was determined by a coin toss, the winner of which could choose either: (a) the first overall pick in the expansion draft and the 28th, and last, pick in the first round of the 1993 MLB amateur draft; or (b) allow the other team to pick first and receive both the second and third overall expansion draft picks, the right to pick first in the subsequent rounds of the expansion draft, and the 27th, and next-to-last, overall pick in the 1993 MLB amateur draft. Colorado won the toss and chose to pick first overall. The three rounds of the draft were televised by ESPN.

Results
With the first pick, the Rockies chose David Nied, who had a 3–0 win–loss record with a 1.17 earned run average in six MLB appearances with the Atlanta Braves. The Marlins' first selection, Nigel Wilson, spent the 1992 season with the Double-A Knoxville Smokies of the Toronto Blue Jays organization, and had no MLB experience.

In total, the Rockies and Marlins chose 41 pitchers with their combined 72 selections. Of the 72 players chosen, 11 were All-Stars during their careers. Jack Armstrong, Bryan Harvey, and Danny Jackson had been All-Stars before the expansion draft, while Andy Ashby, Brad Ausmus, Vinny Castilla, Jeff Conine, Carl Everett, Joe Girardi, Harvey, Trevor Hoffman, Jackson, and Eric Young became All-Stars later on in their careers. Hoffman would also be elected to the Hall of Fame in 2018.

Draft-day trades
The following trades were announced at the conclusion of the expansion draft:

The Marlins traded Danny Jackson to the Philadelphia Phillies for Joel Adamson and Matt Whisenant.
The Marlins traded Greg Hibbard to the Chicago Cubs for Gary Scott and Alex Arias.
The Marlins traded Eric Helfand and Scott Baker to the Oakland Athletics for Walt Weiss.
The Marlins traded Tom Edens to the Houston Astros for Héctor Carrasco and Brian Griffiths.
The Rockies traded Kevin Reimer to the Milwaukee Brewers for Dante Bichette.
The Rockies traded Jody Reed to the Los Angeles Dodgers for Rudy Seánez.
The Cincinnati Reds traded Norm Charlton to the Seattle Mariners for Kevin Mitchell.

Aftermath
Several older star players who were left unprotected, including Danny Tartabull, Jack Morris, and Shawon Dunston, were not selected due to their high salaries and advanced age. Based on the results of the expansion draft, the Marlins were projected to have a higher payroll in 1993 than the Rockies. The Rockies' payroll appeared to be $4 million, less than what the Marlins would pay Bryan Harvey.

The New York Yankees challenged the validity of the draft on the basis that the Marlins did not compensate the Yankees for the loss of territory in Fort Lauderdale, Florida, where the Yankees had a minor league team.  They attempted to revoke the assignment of Hayes and Ausmus to the Rockies and Everett to the Marlins. Invoking the "best interests of baseball" clause, Commissioner Bud Selig and the major league executive council affirmed the draft results.

In the 1993 Major League Baseball season, the Marlins and Rockies both finished sixth out of seven teams in their respective divisions. The Rockies were the first team to reach the playoffs, using the roster they developed through the expansion draft to win the wild card in 1995, a record for the shortest amount of time for an expansion team to make the playoffs in any sport at the time. (The Arizona Diamondbacks would go on to break the record by reaching the playoffs in 1999, their second year of existence.) Ritz and Painter, both selected in the expansion draft, started Games 1 and 2 of the 1995 National League Division Series for the Rockies. The Rockies added free agent acquisition Larry Walker to a lineup of power hitters in Galarraga, Bichette, and Castilla, known collectively as the "Blake Street Bombers".

Meanwhile, the Marlins kept fewer players they selected in the expansion draft than the Rockies. In 1996, the Rockies retained 13 players from the draft, while the Marlins had six. Jeff Conine, nicknamed "Mr. Marlin", was the only player selected in the expansion draft on the Marlins' 1997 World Series championship roster. However, the Marlins used the players selected in the expansion draft to craft their 1997 roster. The Marlins traded three players selected in the draft, Hoffman, Martínez and Berumen, to the San Diego Padres for Gary Sheffield, a key member of the 1997 Florida Marlins. However, other key players to the Marlins' World Series championship were signed as free agents. The 1997 Marlins set records by reaching and winning the World Series in the team's fifth year (these records were broken by the 2001 Arizona Diamondbacks, who won the World Series in their fourth year of existence) and were the first wild card team to win the World Series.

See also

1993 Major League Baseball expansion

References
Footnotes

Bibliography

Expansion draft
Expansion draft
Expansion draft
Major League Baseball expansion drafts
Major League Baseball expansion draft
Baseball in New York City
Sporting events in New York City